The Philippines participated at the 31st Southeast Asian Games which was held from 12 to 23 May 2022 in Hanoi, Vietnam.

The delegation finished fourth in the medal tally winning 52 gold, 70 silver and 104 bronze medals.

Preparations
Philippine Sports Commission head Ramon Fernandez was appointed as the chef de mission for the Philippine delegation for the 2021 Southeast Asian Games. Preparations for the biannual tournament has been hampered by the COVID-19 pandemic, which also led to the cancellation of the 2020 ASEAN Para Games which was supposed to be hosted by the country.

The Philippines planned to send 656 athletes competing in 39 sports for the 2021 Southeast Asian Games. The country intended to compete in all sports except xiangqi. The contingent was trimmed down from 627 athletes due to budgetary constraints. The final delegation was expanded again. The final delegation consists of 981 people, among them are 641 athletes competing in 38 sports, 318 officials and 18 support staff members.

The PSC initially planned to regain supervision over the Rizal Memorial Sports Complex and PhilSports Complex, which were used as quarantine facilities for COVID-19 patients. so it could be used by athletes set to represent the country at the 2021 SEA Games as training venues by April 15, 2021. However, due to the re-imposition of enhanced community quarantine (ECQ) measures in the Greater Manila Area, such plans were scrapped and the country's national sports associations are tasked to set up their own training bubble elsewhere, where ECQ is not in place. The ongoing training of taekwondo and boxers at the Inspire Sports Academy in Calamba was also modified to individual workouts from face-to-face training for the entire duration of the ECQ.

Ernest John Obiena was designated as the delegation's flagbearer for the opening ceremony.

Impact of the COVID-19 pandemic
On April 7, 2021, the Philippine Olympic Committee pledged that all athletes who will participate in the games would be given COVID-19 vaccines after securing a $40,000 grant from the Olympic Council of Asia. Al Panlilio was also tasked to head the vaccination program of the Philippine delegation for the 2021 SEA Games.

Athletes who tested positive for COVID-19 could be still replaced prior to the start of the games. This does not apply to the football teams which were allowed to include extra players.

At least three athletes tested positive for COVID-19. This include swimmer Luke Gebbie, national record holder for the 100-meter freestyle, who was rendered unable to compete.

Medalists

Medalists are entitled to Incentives for Medalists in the Philippines incentive from the government through the Philippine Sports Commission per R.A. 10699.

Gold

Silver

Bronze

Multiple Medalists

Medal summary

By sports

By date

Athletics

Men's

Women's

Mixed

Basketball

The 3x3 teams failed to defend their title.

Summary

Badminton

Men

Women

Billiards and Snooker

Bodybuilding

The Philippines entered nine bodybuilders. However none were able to fulfill prior competition requirements which the IFBB Philippines says it was unaware of.

Edward Alido (men's 55kg)
Leidon Cruz (men's 60kg)
Alexis Abule (men's 65kg)
Roderick Ternida (men's 70kg)
Homer Valmonte (men's 75kg)
Jesse Virata (men's 80kg)
Renz Murphy Alimorong (men's athletic physique)
Jose Mari Jereza Jr. (mixed pairs)
Lorelei Rosa Deloria (mixed pairs)

Bowling

Men

Women

Boxing

Chess

Women

Cycling

Mountain

Diving 

Philippines sent a lone female athlete.
Women

Esports

CrossFire

FIFA Online 4 
The Philippines were grouped in Group A along with Malaysia and host Vietnam. They did not manage to win any game, consequentially failing progress out of the group stage.

League of Legends

Arena of Valor

Garena Free Fire

League of Legends: Wild Rift (Mobile)

Mobile Legends: Bang Bang

PUBG Mobile (Individual)

PUBG Mobile (Team)

Football

Summary

Gymnastics

Men

Men

Women

Handball

Beach handball

Kickboxing 

Men

Women

Pencak silat 

Seni

Tanding

Rowing

Men

Women

Tennis
The International Tennis Federation (ITF) and Asian Tennis Federation (ATF) allowed the participation of Filipino players despite the suspension of the Philippine Tennis Association.

Jeson Patrombon
Francis Casey Alcantara
Ruben Gonzales
Treat Huey
Eric Olivarez Jr.
Shaira Rivera
Jennayla Trulla
Marian Capadocia
Alex Eala

Triathlon/Duathlon

Triathlon

Duathlon

Volleyball

Indoor Volleyball 
Philippines Men's Volleyball team failed to defend their silver medal last Southeast Asian Games 2019.

Beach Volleyball 
Summary

Weightlifting

Men's

Women's

References

2022 in Philippine sport
2021 Southeast Asian Games
Nations at the 2021 Southeast Asian Games